Fakhrabad or Fakher Abad may refer to:

Ardabil Province
 Fakhrabad, Ardabil, a village in Meshgin Shahr County

Chaharmahal and Bakhtiari Province
 Fakhrabad, Chaharmahal and Bakhtiari, a village in Kuhrang County

Fars Province
Fakhrabad, Bavanat, a village in Bavanat County
Fakhrabad, Marvdasht, a village in Marvdasht County
Fakhrabad, Neyriz, a village in Neyriz County
Fakhrabad, Qatruyeh, a village in Neyriz County
Fakhrabad, Sepidan, a village in Sepidan County

Gilan Province
 Fakhrabad, Gilan, a village in Rasht County

Golestan Province
 Fakhrabad, Golestan, a village in Gorgan County

Hormozgan Province
 Fakhrabad, Hajjiabad, a village in Hajjiabad County
 Fakhrabad, Minab, a village in Minab County

Isfahan Province
 Fakhrabad, Aran va Bidgol, a village in Aran va Bidgol County
 Fakhrabad, Mobarakeh, a village in Mobarakeh County

Kerman Province
 Fakhrabad, Baft, a village in Baft County
 Fakhrabad, Bardsir, a village in Bardsir County
 Fakhrabad 1, a village in Kerman County
 Fakhrabad, Rafsanjan, a village in Rafsanjan County
 Fakhrabad, Sirjan, a village in Sirjan County

Kurdistan Province
 Fakhrabad, Kurdistan, a village in Qorveh County

Lorestan Province
 Fakhrabad-e Olya, a village in Lorestan Province, Iran
 Farrokhabad-e Olya, Kuhdasht, a village in Lorestan Province, Iran
 Farrokhabad-e Sofla, a village in Lorestan Province, Iran

Razavi Khorasan Province
 Fakhrabad, Bajestan, a village in Bajestan County
 Fakhrabad, Mashhad, a village in Mashhad County
 Fakhrabad, Nishapur, a village in Nishapur County
 Fakhrabad, Quchan, a village in Quchan County
 Fakhrabad, Torbat-e Heydarieh, a village in Torbat-e Heydarieh County

Semnan Province

South Khorasan Province
 Fakhrabad, Khusf, a village in Khusf County
 Fakhrabad, Qaleh Zari, a village in Khusf County
 Fakhrabad, Zirkuh, a village in Zirkuh County

Tehran Province
 Fakhrabad, Tehran, a village in Varamin County

Yazd Province
 Fakhrabad, Ardakan, a village in Ardakan County
 Fakhrabad, Mehriz, a village in Mehriz County
 Fakhrabad, Taft, a village in Taft County